Enan (Mandarin: 俄南乡) is a township in Dêgê County, Garzê Tibetan Autonomous Prefecture, Sichuan, China. In 2010, Enan Township had a total population of 1,456: 694 males and 762 females: 385 aged under 14, 981 aged between 15 and 65 and 90 aged over 65.

References 
 

Township-level divisions of Sichuan
Populated places in the Garzê Tibetan Autonomous Prefecture